State Road 62 (SR 62) is a  state highway in Manatee and Hardee counties in the US state of Florida that passes through scrubland from Parrish to near Bowling Green.

Route description

The paved SR 62 is only two lanes wide over its entire route and cuts through the Manatee River basin. The road crosses Horse Creek and the North Fork of the Manatee River. It provides access to the Tampa Bay area from Hardee County.

Inside Duette, SR 62 meets with the intersection of Keentown Road. Keentown Road is a  dirt road that leads into the hamlet of Keentown, a farming community. There are only 3 major junctions on this highway, Florida State Road 37, CR 39, and CR 663.

 east of Parrish is Lake Parrish, an artificial lake. It is home to an FPL power plant and a boat ramp.

Major intersections

See also

References

External links

 Florida Route Log (SR 62)

062
062
062